Pyrosilicic acid is the chemical compound with formula  or . It is one of the silicic acids and has pyrosilicate as its conjugate base.

It was synthesized, using nonaqueous solutions, in 2017.
H6Si2O7(aq) -> 2 SiO2(s) + 3 H2O
Pyrosilicic acid may be present in sea water and other natural waters at very low concentration. Compounds formally derived from it, such as sodium pyrosilicate, are found in the sorosilicate minerals.

References

Oxoacids
Silicon compounds